Columbia County is a county located in the U.S. state of Wisconsin. As of the 2020 census, the population was 58,490. Its county seat and largest city is Portage. The county was created in 1846 as part of Wisconsin Territory.

Columbia County is part of the Madison, WI Metropolitan Statistical Area as well as the Madison-Janesville-Beloit, WI Combined Statistical Area.

Geography
The county's highest point is in the Baraboo Range, near Durward's Glen at 1,480 feet above sea level.

Major highways

  Interstate 39
  Interstate 90
  Interstate 94
  U.S. Highway 51
  U.S. Highway 151
  Highway 13
  Highway 16
  Highway 22
  Highway 23
  Highway 33
  Highway 44
  Highway 60
  Highway 73
  Highway 78
  Highway 89
  Highway 113
  Highway 127
  Highway 146
  Highway 188

Railroads
Amtrak
Wisconsin and Southern Railroad
Canadian Pacific
Union Pacific
Columbus station
Portage station
Wisconsin Dells station

Buses
List of intercity bus stops in Wisconsin

Airports
 94C - Gilbert Field airport serves the county and surrounding communities.
 C47 - Portage Municipal Airport supports the county.

Adjacent counties
 Marquette County – north
 Green Lake County – northeast
 Dodge County – east
 Dane County – south
 Sauk County – west
 Juneau County – northwest
 Adams County – northwest

Demographics

2020 census
As of the census of 2020, the population was 58,490. The racial makeup of the county was 91.9% White, 1.5% Black or African American, 0.7% Asian, 0.5% Native American, 1.3% from other races, and 4.1% from two or more races. Ethnically, the population was 3.7% Hispanic or Latino of any race.

2000 census

As of the census of 2000, there were 52,468 people, 20,439 households, and 14,164 families residing in the county. The population density was 68 people per square mile (26/km2). There were 22,685 housing units at an average density of 29 per square mile (11/km2). The racial makeup of the county was 97.18% White, 0.88% Black or African American, 0.35% Native American, 0.33% Asian, 0.02% Pacific Islander, 0.44% from other races, and 0.79% from two or more races. 1.58% of the population were Hispanic or Latino of any race. 46.4% were of German, 10.2% Norwegian, 7.8% Irish, 6.4% English and 5.0% United States or American ancestry.

There were 20,439 households, out of which 32.20% had children under the age of 18 living with them, 58.10% were married couples living together, 7.40% had a female householder with no husband present, and 30.70% were non-families. 25.50% of all households were made up of individuals, and 11.00% had someone living alone who was 65 years of age or older.  The average household size was 2.49 and the average family size was 2.99.

In the county, the population was spread out, with 25.20% under the age of 18, 7.10% from 18 to 24, 29.90% from 25 to 44, 23.40% from 45 to 64, and 14.40% who were 65 years of age or older. The median age was 38 years. For every 100 females, there were 101.60 males. For every 100 females age 18 and over, there were 100.40 males.

In 2017, there were 602 births, giving a general fertility rate of 63.9 births per 1000 women aged 15–44, the 35th highest out of all 72 Wisconsin Counties. Additionally, there were 63 reported induced abortions performed on women of Columbia County residence, with a rate of 6.7 abortions per 1000 women aged 15–44, which is above the Wisconsin average rate of 5.2.

Communities

Cities
 Columbus (partly in Dodge County)
 Lodi
 Portage (county seat)
 Wisconsin Dells (partly in Adams County, Juneau County, and Sauk County)

Villages

 Arlington
 Cambria
 Doylestown
 Fall River
 Friesland
 Pardeeville
 Poynette
 Randolph (mostly in Dodge County)
 Rio
 Wyocena

Towns

 Arlington
 Caledonia
 Columbus
 Courtland
 Dekorra
 Fort Winnebago
 Fountain Prairie
 Hampden
 Leeds
 Lewiston
 Lodi
 Lowville
 Marcellon
 Newport
 Otsego
 Pacific
 Randolph
 Scott
 Springvale
 West Point
 Wyocena

Census-designated places
 Lake Wisconsin (partial)

Unincorporated communities

 Anacker
 Belle Fountain
 Dekorra
 Durwards Glen
 East Friesland
 Englewood
 Harmony Grove
 Ingle
 Keyeser
 Leeds
 Leeds Center
 Lewiston
 Lowville
 Marcellon
 North Leeds
 Okee
 Otsego

Ghost town/neighborhood
 Moe Settlement

Politics
For most of its history, Columbia County voters have backed the Republican Party candidate in national elections. Prior to 1992, the only times Republicans failed to win the county in the preceding 100 years of presidential elections were in the midst of a divided party vote in 1912, in 1924 when Wisconsinite Robert La Follette was on the ballot, and in the national Democratic Party landslides of 1932, 1936, & 1964. From 1992 onward, the county has been a Democratic-leaning swing county, voting for the statewide winner in all presidential elections since then except in 2004 and 2020, and voting for the national winner in all except 2000 and 2020. Republican Donald Trump won narrow pluralities in the county in 2016 and 2020, although a majority of county residents supported Democrat Tammy Baldwin's re-election to the United States Senate in 2018.

See also
 National Register of Historic Places listings in Columbia County, Wisconsin
List of counties in Wisconsin

References

Further reading
 The History of Columbia County, Wisconsin. Chicago: Western Historical Company, 1880.
 Memorial and Biographical Record and Illustrated Compendium of Biography ... of Columbia, Sauk and Adams counties, Wisconsin.... Chicago: Geo. A. Ogle, 1901.

External links
 Columbia County government website
 Columbia County map from the Wisconsin Department of Transportation

 
1846 establishments in Wisconsin Territory
Madison, Wisconsin, metropolitan statistical area
Populated places established in 1846